An internal link is a type of hyperlink on a web page to another page or resource, such as an image or document, on the same website or domain.

Hyperlinks are considered either "external" or "internal" depending on their target or destination. Generally, a link to a page outside the same domain or website is considered external, whereas one that points at another section of the same web page or to another page of the same website or domain is considered internal. These definitions become clouded, however, when the same organization operates multiple domains functioning as a single web experience, e.g. when a secure commerce website is used for purchasing things displayed on a non-secure website. In these cases, links that are "external" by the above definition can conceivably be classified as "internal" for some purposes. Ultimately, an internal link points to a web page or resource in the same root directory.

Similarly, seemingly "internal" links are in fact "external" for many purposes, for example in the case of linking among subdomains of a main domain, which are not operated by the same person(s). For example, a blogging platform, such as WordPress, Blogger or Tumblr host thousands of different blogs on subdomains, which are entirely unrelated and the authors of which are generally unknown to each other. In these contexts one might view a link as "internal" only if it linked within the same blog, not to other blogs within the same domain.

Both internal and external links allow users of the website to navigate to another web page or resource. Internal linking allows for good website navigation and structure and allows search engines to crawl or spider websites. Some websites' content management systems are better than others for optimizing internal links.

See also
 Backlink

References

Hypertext
WordPress